The 2021–22 Lechia Gdańsk season is the club's 78th season of existence, and their 14th continuous in the top flight of Polish football. The season covered the period from 1 July 2021 to 30 June 2022.

Players

First team squad

 
 

 

 

 

 

 
 

 
 
 

 

Key

Out on loan

Transfers

In

Out

Competitions

Friendlies

Summer

Winter

Spring

Ekstraklasa

League table

Regular season

Polish Cup

Statistics

Goalscorers

References

Lechia Gdańsk seasons
Lechia Gdańsk